Al-Jazari is an Arabic surname. The attributive title (nisba), Jazari, denotes an origin from Jazirat ibn 'Umar

Notable people with the surname include:
Ibn al-Razzaz Al-Jazari, Muslim polymath who lived during the Islamic Golden Age (Middle Ages)
Ali 'Izz al-Din Ibn al-Athir al-Jazari: a prominent Muslim historian
Muhammad ibn Muhammad Ibn al-Jazari: a distinguished Muslim scholar in the field of the qira'at of the Qur'an

Arabic-language surnames
Jazari